Doryichthys, river pipefish, is a genus of Asian freshwater pipefishes.

Etymology 
Their name is derived from the Greek dory meaning "lance" and ichthys meaning fish.

Species
There are currently five recognized species in this genus:
 Doryichthys boaja (Bleeker, 1850) (Asian river pipefish)
 Doryichthys contiguus Kottelat, 2000
 Doryichthys deokhatoides (Bleeker, 1854) (Large-spots river pipefish)
 Doryichthys heterosoma (Bleeker, 1851) (Sambas river pipefish)
 Doryichthys martensii (W. K. H. Peters, 1868) (Martens' pipefish)

References

 
Freshwater fish genera
Taxa named by Johann Jakob Kaup